Gabriel-Marie Garrone (12 October 1901 in Aix-les-Bains, Savoie, France – 15 January 1994 in Rome, Italy) was a cardinal of the Roman Catholic Church and a Prefect of the Congregation for Catholic Education.

Gabriel-Marie Garrone was born in Aix-les-Bains, France. He entered the seminary and was educated at the Pontifical Gregorian University in Rome and later, at the Pontifical French Seminary also in Rome.

Priesthood
He was ordained on 11 April 1925 and served as a faculty member of the Minor Seminary of Chambéry until 1926 when he was a faculty member of the Major Seminary until 1939. He did pastoral work in the archdiocese of Chambéry during these years also. He was an officer in the French Army during World War II and a prisoner of war. After the war he was the rector of the Major Seminary of Chambéry until 1947.

Episcopate
Pope Pius XII appointed him titular archbishop of Lemnos and coadjutor bishop of Toulouse on 24 April 1947. He was consecrated exactly two months later. He succeeded to the metropolitan see of Toulouse on 5 November 1956. He attended the Second Vatican Council in Rome from 1962 until 1965. He was appointed Pro-Prefect of the Prefect of the Congregation of Seminaries and Universities by Pope Paul VI on 28 January 1966. He was transferred to the titular see of Torri di Numidia on 24 March 1966.

Cardinalate
He was created and proclaimed Cardinal-Priest of Santa Sabina in the consistory of 26 June 1967. Pope Paul named him full Prefect of the Congregation for Catholic Education and grand chancellor of the Pontifical Gregorian University on 17 January 1968.  He took part in the conclaves that elected Pope John Paul I and Pope John Paul II in August and October. He resigned the prefecture on 15 January 1980. He lost the right to participate in any future conclaves when he turned 80 years of age in 1981. He was appointed as the first President of the newly established Pontifical Council for Culture on 20 May 1982. He resigned the presidency in 1988. He died in 1994 and was buried temporarily at the Campo Verano, Rome, awaiting completion of his definitive tomb in the church of San Luigi dei Francesi.

References

Account of the life of Cardinal Garrone, by Cardinal Paul Poupard
Brief curriculum vitae

1901 births
1994 deaths
People from Aix-les-Bains
French military personnel of World War II
20th-century French cardinals
Participants in the Second Vatican Council
Archbishops of Toulouse
French prisoners of war in World War II
Members of the Congregation for Catholic Education
Pontifical Council for Culture
World War II prisoners of war held by Germany
Cardinals created by Pope Paul VI
Pontifical Gregorian University alumni
Pontifical French Seminary alumni